The .380 ACP (9×17mm) (Automatic Colt Pistol) is a rimless, straight-walled pistol cartridge developed by firearms designer John Moses Browning.  The cartridge headspaces on the mouth of the case.  It was introduced in 1908 by Colt, for use in its new Colt Model 1908 pocket hammerless semi-automatic, and has been a popular self-defense cartridge ever since, seeing wide use in numerous handguns (typically smaller weapons). Other names for .380 ACP include .380 Auto, 9×17mm, 9mm Browning, 9mm Corto, 9mm Kurz, 9mm Short, and 9mm Browning Court (which is the C.I.P. designation). It should not be confused with .38 ACP. The .380 ACP does not strictly conform to cartridge naming conventions, named after the diameter of the bullet, as the actual bullet diameter of the .380 ACP is .355 inches.

Design
The .380 ACP cartridge was derived from Browning's earlier .38 ACP design, which was only marginally more powerful. The .380 ACP was designed to be truly rimless, and headspaces on the case mouth instead of the rim for better accuracy. These relatively low-powered designs were intended for blowback pistols which lacked a barrel locking mechanism, which is often required for any handgun firing a round more powerful than a .380 ACP. Using blowback operation, the design can be simplified, and lowered in cost; a locking mechanism is unnecessary, since the mass of the slide and strength of the recoil spring are enough to absorb the recoil energy of the round, due to the round's relatively low bolt thrust. Blowback operation also permits the barrel to be permanently fixed to the frame, which promotes accuracy, unlike a traditional short recoil-operation pistol, which requires a tilting barrel to unlock the slide and barrel assembly when cycling. A drawback of the blowback system is that it requires a certain amount of slide mass to counter the recoil of the round used. The higher the power of the round, the heavier the slide assembly has to be in order for its inertia to safely absorb the recoil, meaning that a typical blowback pistol in a given caliber will be heavier than an equivalent recoil-operated weapon. Blowback weapons can be made in calibers larger than .380 ACP, but the required weight of the slide and strength of the spring makes this an unpopular option. Although the low power of the .380 ACP does not require a locking mechanism, there have been a number of locked-breech pistols chambered in .380 ACP, such as the Remington Model 51, Kel-Tec P3AT and Glock 42; all three being designed to be lighter than blowback-operated .380 ACP weapons. There have also been some relatively diminutive (blowback-operated) submachine guns, such as the Ingram MAC-11 and the Czech vz. 83.

Users
The .380 ACP has experienced widespread usage since its introduction in the United States (1908) and in Europe (1912). It was later adopted by the armies of at least five European nations as their standard pistol cartridge before World War II; Czechoslovakia (Vz.38), Hungary (FEMARU 37M), and Italy, all of whom used domestic designs, as well as The Netherlands and Yugoslavia, both of whom adopted the FN Model 1922. It was also used extensively by Germany, who captured or purchased hundreds of thousands of pistols in this caliber during World War II. Popular German built commercial models, such as the Walther PPK were very popular with German officers. The Italian Army used the Beretta M1934, but the Italian Air Force and Navy stuck with the 7.65mm/.32 ACP when they adopted the Beretta M1935.

While .380 ACP was considered to be a moderately powerful service pistol round before World War II when compared to the .32 ACP pistols it replaced, no nation retained it as a military service cartridge for very long after the war (when it was largely replaced by the more powerful 9×19mm Parabellum). It was widely used by police forces in Europe until the 1970s, when more powerful 9×19mm handguns began to replace it in this market as well. It does find some use as a backup gun due to the generally small and easily concealable size of the weapons that chambered it (very few "mini pistols" are made in calibers larger than .380 ACP, and those few that are, are recent developments), and is popular on the civilian market as a personal defense round. The .380 ACP round is suitable for self-defense situations as a choice for concealed carry pistols. It was the round used in Defense Distributed's "Wiki Weapon" project to successfully 3D print a firearm.

Performance

The .380 ACP is compact and light, but has a relatively short range and less stopping power than other modern pistol cartridges, depending on the load of the cartridge and manufacturer.  .380 ACP remains a popular self-defense cartridge for shooters who want a lightweight or smaller pistol with manageable recoil. It is slightly less powerful than a standard-pressure .38 Special but also uses 9 mm (.355) diameter bullets.  The standard bullet weights are generally 80, 85, 90, 95, 100, 115, and 120 grain, though between 80 to 100 grain is the most common.

The wounding potential of bullets is often characterized in terms of a bullet's expanded diameter, penetration depth, and energy. The table below shows common performance parameters for several .380 ACP loads.

Key:
Expansion — expanded bullet diameter (ballistic gelatin).
Penetration — penetration depth (ballistic gelatin).
PC — permanent cavity volume (ballistic gelatin, FBI method).
TSC — temporary stretch cavity volume (ballistic gelatin).

Synonyms
United States — .380 Auto / .380 ACP / 9x17mm / 9mm Short / 9mm Browning Short
Spanish and Italian — 9mm Corto / 9mm Short 
French — 9mm Court / 9mm Short
Portuguese — 9mm Curto / 9mm Short
Dutch — 9mm Kort / 9mm Short
Bosnian — 9mm Kratak / 9mm Short
Serbian, Croatian, and Slovenian — 9mm Kratak / 9mm short / Kratka 9 (Kratka Devetka) / Short 9 (Short Nine)
Bulgarian and Macedonian — 9mm Kas / 9mm Short
German — 9mm Kurz / 9mm Short
Romanian — 9mm Scurt / 9mm Short
 United Kingdom — 9mm Browning / 9mm Browning Short / 9mm Short

See also
9 mm caliber
List of firearms
List of handgun cartridges
Table of handgun and rifle cartridges

References

External links
Colt Automatic Pistols
Article on Defensive Use of .380 ACP from American Rifleman 
StoppingPower.Info .380 ACP vs various target videos
Ballistics By The Inch .380 ACP Results.

380 ACP
Military cartridges
.380 ACP firearms
Colt cartridges
Weapons and ammunition introduced in 1908